Devil's Playground is a 1937 American romantic drama film directed by Erle C. Kenton and starring Richard Dix, Dolores del Río and Chester Morris. It is a remake of Frank Capra's Submarine (1928).

Plot
Submarine chief petty officers Dorgan and Mason battle on land for the affections of dancehall girl Carmen. She marries Dorgan but makes a play for Mason when her husband is away on sea duty. The romantic rivalry is forgotten when Dorgan must rescue Mason and his crew from a sunken sub.

Cast
 Richard Dix as Jack Dorgan
 Dolores del Río as Carmen
 Chester Morris as Robert Mason
 Ward Bond as Sidecar Wilson
 John Gallaudet as Jones
 Pierre Watkin as Submarine Commander
 Francis McDonald as Romano
 Stanley Andrews as Salvage Boat Commander

References

External links
 
 The Devil's Playground in TCM.com''
 
 

1937 films
1937 romantic drama films
Films directed by Erle C. Kenton
American black-and-white films
American romantic drama films
Columbia Pictures films
1930s English-language films
1930s American films